The 2005 Japanese Formula 3 Championship was the 26th edition of the Japanese Formula 3 Championship. It began on 2 April at Motegi and ended on 23 October at the same place. Brazilian driver João Paulo de Oliveira took the championship title, winning seven from 20 races.

Teams and drivers
 All teams were Japanese-registered. All cars were powered by Bridgestone tyres.

Race calendar and results

Standings
Points are awarded as follows:

References

External links
 Official Site 

Formula Three
Japanese Formula 3 Championship seasons
Japan
Japanese Formula 3